James Sheffield, Lord Sheffield (fl. 1640) was an English politician who sat in the House of Commons of England  in 1640. He supported the Parliamentary cause in the English Civil War.

Sheffield was the son of Edmund Sheffield and his wife Mariana Irwin. When his father became Earl of Mulgrave, he received the courtesy title Lord Sheffield. He died before his father and the title went to his nephew, Edmund Sheffield, 2nd Earl of Mulgrave.
 
In April 1640, Sheffield was elected Member of Parliament for St Mawes in the Short Parliament. In 1642 he was a captain in the parliamentarian army of the Earl of Essex, and in 1645 a Colonel in the New Model Army.

References

Members of the pre-1707 English Parliament for constituencies in Cornwall
Roundheads
Year of death missing
Year of birth missing
Place of birth missing
English MPs 1640 (April)
Younger sons of barons